Tim Berra may refer to:

 Tim Berra (American football) (born 1951), American football player
 Tim Berra (biologist), American biologist